Scambus is a genus of wasps. Species are found in Europe, the Middle East (Turkey), South America (Peru)

References

Pimplinae
Ichneumonidae genera